A bequest motive seeks to provide an economic justification for the phenomenon of intergenerational transfers of wealth. In other words, to explain why people leave money behind when they die.

Which bequest motive theory most realistically represents the intentions of estate planners is unclear. Attempts to test the theories empirically are mired by poor availability of data about wealth holdings.

The most common explanation for this is altruism, in which it is held that the disponer gains some form of satisfaction from knowing that his/her heirs will enjoy their inherited wealth. An example might be a parent leaving a child the family home.
Another common explanation is accidental bequest, developed by economists Yaari (1965) and Davies (1980).  Here it is not assumed that the disponer (testator) gains any specific benefit from leaving a bequest, but rather that lifetime is uncertain, and so she/he holds precautionary savings to insure him/herself against the risk of living too long. Unspent wealth at time of death is transferred according to intestacy law.
Finally, exchange bequest occurs where disponers engage in a sort of strategic game in which potential beneficiaries must render a (non-marketable) service in exchange for the promise of inherited wealth. The most widely read model of exchange bequest was published by Bernheim, Summers and Shleifer (1985).

See also
 Family economics

References

Bernheim, B.D.; Shleifer, A.; Summers L.H. (1985) “The Strategic Bequest Motive” in Journal of Political Economy, Vol 93, No. 6, 1045-1076

Masson, A. and Pestieau P. (1997) “Bequest Motives and Models of Inheritance:  A Survey of the Literature” in (Erreygers and Vandevelde eds.) Is Inheritance Legitimate?  Ethical and Economic Aspects of Wealth Transfers Springer, Berlin

Family economics
Inheritance